Rosetta Luce Gilchrist (Luce; April 11, 1850February 17, 1921) was an American physician, author, novelist, poet, and correspondent. She served as president of the Ashtabula Equal Rights Club. Gilchrist died in 1921.

Biography
Rosetta Luce was born in Kingsville, Ashtabula County, Ohio, April 11, 1850. In youth, she was a student in the Kingsville, or Rexville, Academy. She graduated from Oberlin College in 1870. In 1890, she graduated from the Cleveland Homeopathic Medical College.

Gilchrist was a successful teacher in the Cleveland public schools. After graduating from medical school, she gained a lucrative practice in the medical profession. Though she gave little attention to literature, her chief talent lay in that direction. Her early work, Apples of Sodom, was a piece of anti-Mormon fiction. Other publications included Margaret's Sacrifice, Thistledew Papers, and numerous poems. Gilchrist served as a correspondent for various newspapers. She was a member of the Woman's National Press Association and the Cleveland Woman's Press Association and president of the Ashtabula Equal Rights Club.

Gilchrist was a talented artist, having done some excellent work in oils, wholly without instruction. She had a family of three children, including a daughter, Jessamine. 

Rosetta Luce Gilchrist died February 17, 1921.

Selected works
 Apples of Sodom, A Story of Mormon Life., 1883
 Tibby: A Novel Dealing with Psychic Forces and Telepathy, 1904
 Margaret's Sacrifice
 Thistledew Papers

References

Bibliography

External links
 
 

1850 births
1921 deaths
19th-century American women writers
19th-century American physicians
19th-century American women physicians
19th-century American poets
Oberlin College alumni
American women poets
People from Kingsville, Ohio
Wikipedia articles incorporating text from A Woman of the Century